Donya Fannizadeh (November 11, 1967 – December 28, 2016) was an Iranian puppeteer, best known for her act with Kolah Ghermezi, her puppet since 1995. Kolah Qermezi was a cultural phenomenon in Iran.

Fannizadeh began her career with the TV puppet series Umbrella with the Song of Rain in 1985 and then collaborated in other TV puppet series including The Curious Little Raven, The Goat with a Bell Foot, Hadi and Hoda, Aunt Spider and Salty Mouse. Her father, Parviz Fannizadeh was an Iranian actor, film and television star.

Death
Fannizadeh died of cancer on December 28, 2016, at the age of 49 at Day Hospital in Tehran.

References

External links

 Cancer of puppeteer of "Kolah Ghermezi"

1967 births
2016 deaths
Iranian puppeteers
People from Tehran
Deaths from cancer in Iran